The Vice Chief of the Naval Staff (VCNS) is a statutory position in the Indian Armed Forces, that is usually held by a three star vice admiral. The Vice Chief is the deputy of the Chief of the Naval Staff and is usually the second highest ranking officer of the Indian Navy. The current VCNS is Vice Admiral Satish Namdeo Ghormade who took over from Vice Admiral G. Ashok Kumar on 31 July 2021.

History

Established on 11 May 1967, the office was first held by Sourendra Nath Kohli, subsequently appointed CNS. The appointment was then in the two-star rank of rear admiral. On 12 December 1967, Nilakanta Krishnan succeeded Kohli as VCNS, with the office being raised to the three-star rank of Vice-Admiral in March 1969.

Organisation
The VCNS heads the Staff Branch-I at the Naval Headquarters. The following Directors General/Controllers/Assistant Principal Staff Officers report into the VCNS. 
 Chief Hydrographer
 Inspector General Nuclear Safety (IGNS)
 Controller Warship Production & Acquisition (CWP&A)
 Director General Project Seabird
 Assistant Chief of Naval Staff (Policy & Plans)
 Assistant Chief of Naval Staff (Staff Requirements)
 Principal Director Naval Plans (PDNP)
 Integrated Financial Advisor (Navy)
 Director General of Naval Armament (DGONA)
 Director General Naval Armament Inspectorate (DGNAI)

Order of precedence
The VCNS ranks at No. 23 on the Indian order of precedence, along with the Vice Chiefs of Staff of the Indian Army and Indian Air Force and the Army Commanders (GOC-in-C), Naval Commanders (FOC-in-C) and Air Commanders (AOC-in-C). The VCNS is at the Apex Pay grade (Grade 17), with a monthly pay of ₹225,000 (US$3,200).

Appointees 
The following table chronicles the appointees to the office of the Vice Chief of the Naval Staff.

See also
 Chief of the Naval Staff
 Vice Chief of the Air Staff
 Vice Chief of the Army Staff
 Deputy Chief of the Naval Staff

Notes

** Went on to become Chief of the Naval Staff.

References

Vice Chiefs of Naval Staff (India)
Vice chiefs of staff
Indian military appointments
Indian Navy appointments